Zindagi Dot Com is an educational television series broadcast on Doordarshan. By 17 August 2014, Doordarshan began the series "Zindagi Dot Com"  with the intent of increasing knowledge of an e-governance plan in the country. Zindagi Dot Com is the production of the National Film Development Corporation of India (NFDC), there will be an estimated of 39 episodes.

References

2014 Indian television series debuts
DD National original programming